Laskowice may refer to the following places:
Laskowice, Kuyavian-Pomeranian Voivodeship (north-central Poland)
Laskowice, Masovian Voivodeship (east-central Poland)
Laskowice, Kluczbork County in Opole Voivodeship (south-west Poland)
Laskowice, Nysa County in Opole Voivodeship (south-west Poland)
Laskowice, Prudnik County in Opole Voivodeship (south-west Poland)
Jelcz-Laskowice in Lower Silesian Voivodeship (south-west Poland)
Laskowice, Pomeranian Voivodeship (north Poland)